Dodaro is a surname. Notable people with the surname include:

Gene Dodaro (born 1951), American government official
Melonie Dodaro (born 1969), Canadian social media expert, author, and entrepreneur
Robert Dodaro (born 1955), American priest 

Italian-language surnames